Elijah Hollands is an Australian rules footballer playing for the Gold Coast Suns in the Australian Football League.

Early life
Hollands was born in Adelaide, South Australia. His father, Ben, was a professional Australian rules footballer who played 8 AFL games for Richmond in 1999 as well as spending years on Sydney and Port Adelaide's AFL lists. Hollands lived the first nine years of his life in Adelaide before relocating to Wodonga on the Victoria-New South Wales border. 

He didn't start playing football until he began with Auskick at the Wodonga Bulldogs going on to play junior football in the Ovens & Murray Football League and made his senior debut for the club at 16 years of age. Leading into his final year of junior football, Hollands was touted as a potential number one draft pick before tearing his ACL and missing the entirety of the 2020 NAB League season. Despite his injury, he was drafted by the Gold Coast Suns with pick 7 in the 2020 AFL draft.

AFL career
Hollands made his AFL debut in QClash 23 against the Brisbane Lions in round 19 of the 2022 AFL season and kicked two goals in his first game, including a goal with his first kick.

References

External links

2002 births
Living people
Gold Coast Football Club players
Australian rules footballers from Victoria (Australia)
People from Wodonga
Australian rules footballers from Adelaide